Qeshlaq-e Hajj Dalan Khan Hoseyn Khodayar (also Romanized as Qeshlāq-e Ḩājj Dalān Khān Ḩoseyn Khodāyār) is a village in Qeshlaq-e Sharqi Rural District, Qeshlaq Dasht District, Bileh Savar County, Ardabil Province, Iran. At the 2006 census, its population was 67, in 13 families.

References 

Towns and villages in Bileh Savar County